The Biju Pattanaik Film and Television Institute of Odisha, Cuttack (BPFTIO) is an autonomous college established by the Government of Odisha under World Bank assisted scheme to meet the emerging demand of well trained technical manpower in the field of television network and film production activities. Situated on the bank of river Mahanadi, BPFTIO occupies an independent space in the sprawling campus of Bhubanananda Orissa School of Engineering (BOSE), Cuttack the oldest Engineering School of the State. Funded by Government of Odisha, Department of Employment and Technical Education & Training, the institute offers diploma courses in 3 disciplines such as Cinematography, Sound & TV. Engineering and Film & Video Editing.

History
The institute was established in 1998.  Government of Odisha has established an autonomous Institute in the name and style of Biju Pattanaik Film & Television Institute of Orissa (BPFTIO) under World Bank assisted scheme to meet the emerging demand of well trained technical manpower in the field of television network and film production activities. Situated on the bank of river Mahanadi, BPFTIO occupies an independent space in the sprawling campus of Bhubanananda Orissa School of Engineering (BOSE), Cuttack the oldest Engineering School of the State. Funded by Government of Odisha, Department of Employment and Technical Education & Training, the institute offers diploma courses in 3 disciplines such as Cinematography, Sound & TV. Engineering and Film & Video Editing.

BPFTIO has some of the most advanced and sophisticated equipments in the Eastern Region and all the three disciplines are managed by experienced faculties. Fourteen batches of students in Cinematography, Eleven batches both in Sound & TV. Engineering and Film & Video Editing have successfully completed their course till date. Almost all the diploma holders of the institute have found gainful employment in Government and Private sector, Media channels, Television & Film industry.

Courses

 Three-year diploma courses in Cinematography
 Sound and TV. Engineering (Audiography) 
 Film and Video Editing

See also
 Film and Television Institute of India
 Bhartendu Natya Academy
 Cinema of India
 Film and Television Institute of India alumni
 Film school
 State Institute of Film and Television
 Satyajit Ray Film and Television Institute
 Government Film and Television Institute
 M.G.R. Government Film and Television Training Institute
 Jyoti Chitraban Film and Television Institute

References

External links
 
 Alumni Website of FTII
 an Informal Space for FTIIans

Film schools in India
Universities and colleges in Odisha
Education in Cuttack
Memorials to Biju Patnaik
Educational institutions established in 1998
1998 establishments in Orissa